Saunders (also known as Right Fork, Three Fork and Three Forks) is an unincorporated community in Logan County, West Virginia, United States.

References

Unincorporated communities in Logan County, West Virginia
Unincorporated communities in West Virginia
Coal towns in West Virginia